The following is a list of notable events and releases that have happened, or are expected to happen in 2022 in music in South Korea.

Notable events and achievements 

 January 5 – V's "Christmas Tree" became the first Korean OST to enter the Billboard Hot 100 at number 79, as well as the first song by a Korean soloist to debut at number one on the US Digital Song Sales chart.
 January 6 – BTS, the Best became the first album by a Korean act in 17 years to sell over 1 million copies on the Oricon Albums Chart in Japan, since BoA's Best of Soul (2005).
 March 1 – Aespa became the first idol group to win Rookie of the Year at the Korean Music Awards, and the most-awarded girl group in the ceremony's history, with a record three wins at the 2022 ceremony.
 April 16, 23 – Coachella: 2NE1 reunites for the first time in over 6 years with a surprise performance on the Coachella main stage. Aespa also performs on the festival's main stage the following weekend.
 May 9 – AleXa performed her song "Wonderland" in American Song Contest and became the first winner.
 June 30 – July 2 − The Jeddah K-Pop Festival 2022 is held at the Jeddah Super Dome—Saudi Arabia's first K-pop festival. Performers included Everglow, Ateez, Epex, Victon, CIX, Monsta X, and Verivery. Everglow becomes the first K-pop girl group to ever perform in Saudi Arabia.
 July 3 – Nayeon became the first K-pop soloist to enter the top 10 on the US Billboard 200 in the chart's history with her EP Im Nayeon.
 July 31 – J-Hope performed at Lollapalooza and became the first South Korean artist to headline the main stage at a major U.S. music festival. 
 September 23, 25 – Blackpink became the first K-pop girl group to top UK Albums Chart with their second full length album Born Pink. Blackpink also became the first K-pop girl group to top US Billboard 200 with Born Pink.
 November 20 – Jungkook performed at the 2022 FIFA World Cup opening ceremony.
 December 5 - Blackpink was named Time Magazine's Entertainer of the Year.
 December 26 – RM’s Indigo reached a peak of 3 on the US Billboard 200, becoming the highest charting Korean soloist on the chart to-date, and the first to reach the top 5.

Award shows and festivals

Award ceremonies

Festivals

Debuting and disbanding in 2022

Debuting groups

Acid Angel from Asia
Apink Chobom
Astro – Jinjin & Rocky
ATBO
Blank2y
Classy
CSR
Fifty Fifty
Got the Beat
H1-Key
ILY:1
Irris
Kep1er
Lapillus
Le Sserafim
Mamamoo+
Mimiirose
NewJeans
Nmixx
Shinhwa WDJ
TAN
Tempest
TNX
Trendz
Viviz
Younite

Solo debuts

Baekho
Chaeyeon
Choi Ye-na
Choi Yoo-jung
Jin
Kihyun
Kino
Kim Jong-hyeon (JR)
Lee Chan-hyuk
Minho
Miyeon
Nayeon
Seulgi
Wonpil
 Xiumin
Yerin
Yuju

Disbandments

 April
 Botopass
 BugAboo
 Bvndit
 CLC
 D-Crunch
Girlkind
Hot Issue
 Lunarsolar
 MVP
 NU'EST
 Redsquare
 TRCNG
 We Girls

Releases in 2022

First quarter

January

February

March

Second quarter

April

May

June

Third quarter

July

August

September

Fourth quarter

October

November

December

See also
 List of South Korean films of 2022
 List of Circle Album Chart number ones of 2022
 List of Circle Digital Chart number ones of 2022

References

2022 in South Korean music
South Korean music
K-pop